Wojciech Grzegorz Leśnikowski (May 9, 1938 – April 17, 2014), was a Polish–American architect, writer and educator. He oversaw and participated in the design and construction of numerous large-scale architectural projects around the world.

Career

Wojciech G. Lesnikowski passed the maturity exam in 1955, in the I Liceum Ogólnokształcące im. Mikołaja Kopernika in Bielsko-Biała(www.kopernik.bielsko.pl). Lesnikowski received his Masters of Architecture and Urban Planning from the Cracow University of Technology, School of Architecture and Urban Planning in 1961. He worked in Krakow, Poland, for a few years, then in 1964 he left for Paris for an internship with the famed architect Le Corbusier. He worked for Pierre Vago and Jean Renaudie, as well as Le Corbusier, while in Paris. He began teaching at the L'Ecole des Beaux-Arts in 1967. He went to America in 1969, worked as an architect in Chicago and continued to teach at numerous prestigious institutions. He was a chief architect at HNTB, Loebl Schlossman & Hackl, and HOK Corporation. He served as the lead designer of a hospital and a skyscraper – the iconic red CNA Center.

He became a distinguished professor at The University of Kansas in 1988. In 1990, he became a Knight of the Order of Arts and Letters in France. In 2013 he became the eighth person to receive a Laurel Award from Krakow, Poland. He has created numerous architectural projects such as housing estates, public buildings, airports, hospitals and skyscrapers in Poland, France, the United States, New Zealand, China, Japan and Italy.

Teaching

1967–69: L'Ecole des Beaux-Arts
1969–72: Yale University
1972–78: Cornell University
1975–79: University of Pennsylvania
1981–88: University of Illinois Chicago
1981―88: University of Wisconsin–Milwaukee
1989–2014: University of Kansas – Distinguished Don Hatch Professor

Writing

1982: Romanticism and Rationalism in Architecture
1990: The New French Architecture
1993: Many Faces of German Modernism
1994: Modernism in Czechoslovakian, Hungarian and Polish Architecture 1919–39
1994: Architecture of Germany between Two World Wars
Numerous articles published in the US, UK, France, Italy, Germany, Switzerland, Netherlands, and Poland

Awards

1977: Fulbright International Award
1981, 1983, 1989: Graham Foundation Grant
1989: Fulbright Grant
1990: Chevalier de L'Ordre des Arts et des Lettres of the French Republic
1991–1992: National endowment for Humanities Grant
1992: German Academy of Science Grant
2013: Krakow Laurel Award

Architectural philosophy

Teaching and research interests

Architectural design: large-scale buildings, current high-tech, future technologies, experimental architecture
Architectural history theories
Aesthetics of modern architecture
Architecture as industrial art
Corporate practice in contemporary architecture

Areas of expertise
Advanced architectural design – large-scale buildings, cutting-edge technologies
Architectural history and theories of architecture
Architectural publications
European current architecture and practice
International airport and skyscraper design

Personal life

Family

Wojciech Lesnikowski was the son of Roman and Irena, born in 1938, one year before the German invasion of Poland. In pre-World War II Poland, his father was a soldier, a lawyer and a politician. His mother was Jewish, so when the Nazis arrived, his father hid the family on the rural property of one of his business clients. His father fought on the side of the Soviet Union later in the war, and was sent to Krakow as a government administrator after it was over. In 1948, when rulers found out about his father's anti-communist sympathies, the authorities came to the Lesnikowski home on Wojciech's 10th birthday. He did not see his father again until 1953, when he was released from a Soviet Gulag following the death of Joseph Stalin. His parents survived the war, but many of his family members did not. Wojciech married a fellow architect and educator Rebecca James in 1987. On July 22, 1995, he became a single parent to his two young daughters, when his wife died in a horse-riding accident in Poland. He later married Julie Lesnikowski, owner of Jordan Ross Designs in Lawrence, Kansas.

Death

April 17, 2014, from brain cancer.

Works

Airport, Krakow
Airport, Warsaw
Airport, Warsaw
Cathedral, Warsaw
Government Center, Taiwan
Hospital, Chicago
Library, Osaka, Japan
Museum of Aviation, Krakow
Office Complex, Taiwan
Office Building, Chicago
Office Building, Chicago
Opera House, St. Louis
Skyscraper, Hong Kong
Skyscraper, New York
Technology Center, Shanghai, China
Skyscraper, Warsaw, Poland
Terminal for Modlin Airport, Poland
Terminal for KC Airport, Missouri
Terminal for Katowice Airport, Poland
Concert Hall for Kansas City, Missouri
Terminal for Krakow Airport, Poland
Terminal for Kansas City Airport, Missouri
New Crystalline Generic Terminal

Further reading

Wojciech Lesnikowski – architect, citizen of the world, Jan Kurek, Politechnika Krakowska im. Tadeusza Kościuszki, 2012 , 9788372426642

References

Further reading
Who's Who in Polish America, 1st edition, 1996–1997, New York, Bicentennial Publishing Corp., 1996,

External links
Architektura.muratorplus.pl
Followscience.com
Poles.org

1938 births
2014 deaths
Architects from Lublin
Modernist architects
Architects from Kraków
20th-century American architects
21st-century American architects
21st-century Polish architects
University of Kansas faculty
Polish emigrants to the United States
Cornell University faculty